Chote is a surname. Notable people with the surname include:

Beth Chote (born 1991), New Zealand actress
David Chote, New Zealand soccer player
Morville Chote (born 1924), British javelin thrower
Robert Chote (born 1968), British economist